"Hallowed Be Thy Name" is the final track on Iron Maiden's 1982 album The Number of the Beast. The song was written by bassist Steve Harris and has been acclaimed as one of the greatest heavy metal songs of all time and is also considered one of the band's signature songs.

Synopsis
"Hallowed Be Thy Name" has remained in almost all of the band's set-lists since the album's recording, the only exceptions being the Maiden England World Tour 2012–14, and the second leg of the Book of Souls World Tour in 2017. Allmusic describes it as "perhaps the most celebrated of the band's extended epics; it's the tale of a prisoner about to be hanged, featuring some of Harris' most philosophical lyrics." Several band-members have since stated that it is one of their favourite tracks, with Bruce Dickinson describing it as "fantastic" and that performing it live is like "narrating a movie to the audience."

It is one of the most covered songs in Iron Maiden's catalogue, with versions released by artists such as Dream Theater, Machine Head, Cradle of Filth and Iced Earth. Iron Maiden also recorded the song as part of Channel Four's 2007 television series, Live from Abbey Road, while a version recorded for BBC Radio 1 in 2005 was used as a B-side on "The Reincarnation of Benjamin Breeg" single. The song's title is a line from the Lord's Prayer.

Songwriting lawsuit
A section of the lyrics are lifted from Beckett's 1973 song "Life's Shadow". Iron Maiden manager Rod Smallwood was the agent for Beckett and a teenage Steve Harris saw the band play this song live. Harris and Dave Murray settled with one of the credited songwriters, Robert Barton. The other songwriter, Brian Ingham, has sued Iron Maiden for his share of the profits from the song. Ingham was unaware of the matter until 2011 and Barton claimed to be the sole songwriter during the original settlement.

On 12 March 2018, it was reported that the band had settled the case out of court. The group's lawyers had argued that Harris initially used the lyrics as a placeholder and did not have time to change them before the album's release. A spokesperson for the band states that they settled out of court for pragmatic reasons and to avoid escalating legal fees.

Personnel
Bruce Dickinson – vocals
Dave Murray – guitars
Adrian Smith – guitars
Steve Harris – bass
Clive Burr – drums

Live single

A live version of the song was released as a single on 4 October 1993 to promote A Real Dead One, a live album featuring recordings from various concerts throughout the Fear of the Dark and Real Live tours. The song was recorded at the Olympic Arena in Moscow on 4 June 1993 during the Real Live Tour. The single's B-sides "The Trooper", "Wasted Years" and "Wrathchild" were recorded during the same tours, but only "The Trooper" is featured on the album. It is the band's last single to feature vocalist Bruce Dickinson until 2000's "The Wicker Man".

Track listing

UK 7" red vinyl

UK 12" picture disc

CD maxi single

Personnel
Bruce Dickinson – vocals
Dave Murray – guitars
Janick Gers – guitars
Steve Harris – bass
Nicko McBrain – drums

Chart performance

References

1982 singles
Iron Maiden songs
Songs written by Steve Harris (musician)
1982 songs
EMI Records singles
Songs about death